Bishop Martin High School (BMHS) is a diocesan Roman Catholic high school located in Orange Walk Town, Belize.

History
BMHS was established on September 2, 2002, by the Roman Catholic Diocese of Belize City-Belmopan, under Bishop Osmond P. Martin. It opened with 60 first form students and Mr. René Constanza as the principal. It moved to the present location on San Lorenzo Road in 2004. In 2018-19 it had an enrollment of 385 students, with Mr. Luis Pook as principal and Mrs. Luisa Gillett vice-principal.

Academics
Students in first and second form (9th and 10th grade in the United States) all have the same curriculum but there are alternate programs in third and fourth forms. The focus of most of the subjects at third and fourth form is preparation for CSEC exams, as is the case in most Belizean high schools.

Education at BMHS is also focused on Catholic faith and values. The calendar includes activities connected to the Church's liturgical year, including an emphasis on mission education – preparing students for today's world but also with a faith in life beyond this world.  The school's patron saint is San Juan Diego, canonized by John Paul II in 2002.

Student life
A special characteristic of the school is its involvement of parents through service hours and also in disciplinary matters. From participation in intramurals to involvement in fundraising activities, the whole school community is involved. The Head of Discipline is in overall charge of disciplinary matters and uses reflection on student behavior and one-on-one counselling, besides involving the parents in the disciplinary process.

Past principals of BMHS
 2002-06  Father René Constanza, CSP
 2006-08 Mrs. Maria Johnston
 2008-10 Mrs. Flavia Burgos
 2010-19  Mr. Luis Pook

References

Bishop Martin High School Handbook, 2013

Catholic secondary schools in Belize
Educational institutions established in 2002
2002 establishments in Belize